is a compilation album released by Rimi Natsukawa on , marketed as an Okinawan song cover album.

Song sources

The album features 10 covers of songs by Okinawan artists. Eight of these are already released tracks. Of the new songs, "Umi no Kanata" is a Parsha Club cover, and "Kui nu Hajimi" is a Misako Koja cover. Both of these artists have been covered before by Natsukawa, and those songs also feature on the album ("Famureuta"/"Manten no Hoshi," "Warabigami" respectively).

Four of the songs are originally from Minamikaze, and two from Tida: Tida Kaji nu Umui and Sora no Keshiki each.

Track listing

Japan sales rankings

References

Rimi Natsukawa albums
2004 compilation albums
Victor Entertainment compilation albums